The Medical Act 1971, is a Malaysian laws which enacted to consolidate and amend the law relating to the registration and practice of medical practitioners and for national purposes to provide for certain provisions with regard to a period of service in the public services after full registration as a medical practitioner; and to make provision for purposes connected with the aforesaid matter.

Structure
The Medical Act 1971, in its current form (1 May 2015), consists of 7 Parts containing 44 sections and 3 schedules (including 63 amendments).
 Part I: Preliminary
 Part II: The Malaysian Medical Council
 Part III: Registration of Medical Practitioners
 Part IV: Disciplinary Proceedings
 Part V: General
 Part VI: Regulations, Saving and Repeal
 Part VII: Supplementary Provisions for National Purposes
 Schedules

The Medical Act 1971 is currently amended by the Medical (Amendment) Act 2012 which came into force on 1 July 2017.

See also
Medical Act

References

External links
 Medical Act 1971 

1971 in Malaysian law
Malaysian federal legislation